Walter G. Campbell (November 8, 1877 – March 20, 1963) was an American chemist who served as Commissioner of Food and Drugs from 1921 to 1924 and from 1927 to 1944.

References

1877 births
1963 deaths
American food chemists
Commissioners of the Food and Drug Administration
People from Knox County, Kentucky
Harding administration personnel
Coolidge administration personnel
Hoover administration personnel
Franklin D. Roosevelt administration personnel